Hot August Night is a 1972 live double album by Neil Diamond. The album is a recording of a Diamond concert on August 24, 1972, one of ten sold-out concerts that Diamond performed that month at The Greek Theatre in Los Angeles. This also marks the first album released by the newly formed MCA Records (a merging of the Uni, Kapp, and Decca labels).

Diamond later released three live "sequel" albums, Hot August Night II (1987), Hot August Night/NYC (2009), and Hot August Night III (2018), as well as the Love at the Greek live album, issued in 1977.

Australian reception
Hot August Night is one of the biggest selling albums of all time in Australia, where it spent 29 weeks at number 1 on the album charts during 1973 and 1974. This makes it equal 5th for the most weeks at number 1, tying with Delta Goodrem's 2003 album Innocent Eyes.

Hot August Night was the number one charting album in Australia for the 1970s, entering the Australian album charts in late 1972 and still charting in the top 20 in 1976. It was the number 1 album of 1973 and the number 3 album of 1974. It re-entered the Australian top 10 in 1982, then had another chart run in 1991-92 peaking at number 21. During the 1991-92 chart-run it was listed on the chart as 14 x Platinum. Based on album accreditation levels used until 1983, it equates to a 700,000 sales milestone. When the album re-entered the albums chart in 2014, it was listed as 10× Platinum. Based on accreditation levels since 1983, it also equates to a 700,000 sales milestone. However, because ARIA was only formed in 1983 and record companies have not reported complete record sales records to them, sales are an estimation only and in the case of 1970's albums like Hot August Night, the conservative estimates may be falling short. In 1996, MCA Managing Director Paul Krige estimated that cumulative sales of Hot August Night in Australia have exceeded one million units. The album's name was referenced in the Season 7 finale for Mystery Science Theater 3000. While watching the scene in Laserblast where a corrupted Billy Duncan is killed by an alien, Mike Nelson makes a riff by saying "Neil Diamond: Hot August Nights."

Critical reception 

In a contemporary review for Rolling Stone, music critic Lester Bangs called Hot August Night a "fine presentation of the entire spectrum" of Diamond's work and praised its music as "great, pretentious, goofy pop" with a melodramatic, "hymn-like feeling".

In a retrospective review, Allmusic editor Stephen Thomas Erlewine called Hot August Night "the ultimate Neil Diamond record ... [which] shows Diamond the icon in full glory." Rob Sheffield, writing in The Rolling Stone Album Guide (2004), dubbed the album "the triumph of Neilness" and said that its music is slightly more "lax" than his studio recordings, but "festive".

Track listing

1972 vinyl edition

2000 compact disc release

2012 40th anniversary deluxe edition

Personnel
 Neil Diamond – vocals and guitar
 Richard Bennett – guitar
 Emory Gordy Jr. – guitar and vibraphone
 Lee Holdridge – orchestra conductor
 Jefferson Kewley – percussion
 Alan Lindgren – keyboards
 Danny Nicholson – guitar
 Reinie Press – bass
 Dennis St. John – drums
 String section – Sidney Sharp, Philip Candreva, Paulo Alencar, Baldassare Ferlazzo, Robert Lipsett, Haim Shtrum, Ron Folsom, Henry Ferber, Hyman Goodman, William Henderson, John DeVoogdt, Wilbert Nuttycombe, Jay Rosen, Walter Wiemeyer, Shari Zippert, Ralph Schaeffer, Tibor Zelig, Walter Rower, Salvatore Crimi, Richard Kaufman, David Turner (violins), Linn Subotnick, Philip Goldberg, Sven Reher, Myron Sandler, Marilyn Baker, Samuel Boghossian (violas), Jesse Ehrlich, Jerome Kessler, Raymond Kelley, Nathan Gershman, Alice Ober, Giacinto Nardulli (violoncelli), Timothy Barr, Jess Bourgeois, Don Bagley (bass violins)

Charts

Weekly charts

Year-end charts

Certifications

References

External links 
 
 "The Night Neil Diamond Whanged His Clanger" by Steven Hyden

Neil Diamond live albums
1972 live albums
MCA Records live albums
Universal Records live albums
Albums recorded at the Greek Theatre (Los Angeles)
Albums conducted by Lee Holdridge
Albums produced by Tom Catalano